The Rochester Lancers are an indoor soccer team in the Major Arena Soccer League 2. The team is named in honor of the Rochester Lancers of the North American Soccer League. The team was active from November 2011 through March 2015. In July 2015, the team cited a sharp increase in the cost of insurance to more than double the team's payroll costs and announced the end of the franchise.  A new version of the team contested the 2018–19 Major Arena Soccer League 2 season; for 2019–20 the team moved back up to the MASL. After another two year hiatus the Lancers are in M2 for the 2022-23 season.

History
In 1995, Salvatore "Soccer Sam" Fantauzzo purchased the Rochester Lancers name and logo as part of his soccer memorabilia collection. In 2010, Fantauzzo started negotiating with commissioner Chris Economides of the USL to be part of the new indoor I-League. The USL struggled to attract teams to the newly formed I-League. At the 2010-2011 MISL Championship game in Baltimore, Fantauzzo convinced MISL commissioner David Grimaldi to meet with the USL and bring the MISL current teams into that organization. The 2011-2012 season saw the new MISL under the USL banner with the four existing MISL teams and the three new I-League teams. Fantauzzo decided to use the Rochester Lancers name and logo for this new indoor MISL team.

Following a merger of the I-League and the third Major Indoor Soccer League, the Lancers played their first game in Syracuse on November 4, 2011, against the Syracuse Silver Knights. Led by team captain and former Rochester Rhinos forward Doug Miller, the first game in the team's history ended in a 16–15 loss and the top scorer was Lubo Kocic who scored 4 goals for the Lancers. The Lancers finished 2nd in the Eastern Division in 2011, qualifying for the playoffs. During the 2011–12 season they, offered a surprise contract to former 76ers player Allen Iverson.

In 2012 assistant coach, Jim Hesch replaced Billy Andracki and became the head coach. Former Cuban International, Rochester Rhino and Rochester Lancers player, Rey 'Boom Boom' Martinez became the assistant coach. The team finished in 5th place in the MISL with a 10-16 record and did not make the playoffs.

The Lancers announced new head coach Josh Rife on September 13, 2013. Josh Rife's assistant coach was Billy Ginther. The team finished in 5th place in the league with a 6-14 record and did not make the playoffs.

After the 2013–2014 season, the team announced that it was leaving the MISL along with five other teams and joining the Premier Arena Soccer League, later was renamed the Major Arena Soccer League. Fantauzzo with Tommy Tanner negotiated hard to keep multi-point scoring in the game of indoor soccer. However, the MASL continued the single point goal system it used as the PASL without 2 & 3 point goals.

On August 2, 2014, team founder and CEO Salvatore Fantauzzo announced that the Lancers would not be playing in the 2014–15 season. Team captain (and Rochester Rhinos legend) Doug Miller intervened and offered to take over management of the team in order to permit the team to preserve its season. Miller later was named coach of the team, though he would continue to play. The team finished in 3rd place in the Eastern Division with a record of 10–10. The team made the playoffs but lost in the division finals to the Baltimore Blast. After the 2014/15 season the team went on a hiatus to hopefully resolve the NYS insurance issues.

In 2017, Soccer Sam licensed his Lancers name & logo to the Rochester River Dogz of the (NPSL). The new Rochester Lancers ownership group included head coach Doug Miller, GM Marc Mandell, Asst GM Nick Mojsovski and CEO Salvatore 'Soccer Sam' Fantauzzo. Weeks later Fantauzzo joined the United Women's Soccer (UWS) and the Lady Lancers were born. Sal Galvano and Loren Inglese handled the team side. Ashley Maria King from the original Lancers handled the business side year one. In 2018, Kayla Klark Kent also from the original Lancers returned to help with the business side. Sal Galvano continued with the team in 2018 as the head coach with Brooke Barbuto as his player/assistant coach.

The Lancers relaunched the indoor team for the 2018–19 season, playing in the Eastern Division of the M2 development league with home games in The Dome Center. The Lancers returned to Division 1 play as they re-joined the MASL for the 2019-20 season, winning only 1 game before competition was halted due to the COVID-19 pandemic.  Plans to join the late-starting 2021 MASL season were cancelled in February, partly due to the Dome Center's use as a New York state COVID vaccination site.

Year-by-year results

Head coaches
 Bill Andracki (2011–12)
 Jim Hesch (2012–13)
 Josh Rife (2013–14)
 Doug Miller (2014–15; 2018–2020)
 Jake Schindler (2022 - present)

201920 roster

201112 roster

201213 roster

201314 roster

201415 roster

References

 
Major Arena Soccer League teams
Indoor soccer clubs in the United States
Major Indoor Soccer League (2008–2014) teams
2010 establishments in New York (state)
Men's soccer clubs in New York (state)